Eicker is a surname. Notable people with the surname include:

Edward Eicker (born 1975), American composer
Friedhelm Eicker (born 1927), German statistician and former professor at the University of Dortmund

See also
Ecker (surname)
Eicher (surname)
Ricker